is a retired volleyball player from Japan. He competed at the 1968 and 1972 Olympics and won a silver and a gold medal, respectively. In 2003, he was inducted into the Volleyball Hall of Fame in Holyoke, Massachusetts.

In 1966 Morita enrolled to the Nippon Physical Education University. The same year he was selected for the national volleyball team and competed at the world championships, where Japan finished fifth, and at the Asian Games, where his team won the gold medal. The team was reorganized in 1966, and became much stronger within a few years, winning two Olympic medals in 1968 and 1972. Morita was a key frontline blocker, who had fast reflexes and good lateral movement, but he could also attack from the back row. He had a nickname "machine gun" because he could launch a split-second spiking attack with the setter. Morita was also known for a few other trademark attacking combinations.

After retiring from competitions Morita was appointed as professor at the Japanese Sports and Science University. Later he also became manager of the national men's volleyball team and a member of the Fédération Internationale de Volleyball (FIVB) Coaching Commission. He was selected as one of the best male volleyball players of the 20th century by the FIVB.

References

Japanese men's volleyball players
Volleyball players at the 1968 Summer Olympics
Volleyball players at the 1972 Summer Olympics
Olympic volleyball players of Japan
Nippon Sport Science University alumni
1947 births
Living people
Olympic medalists in volleyball
Asian Games medalists in volleyball
Volleyball players at the 1966 Asian Games
Volleyball players at the 1970 Asian Games
Medalists at the 1972 Summer Olympics
Medalists at the 1968 Summer Olympics
Asian Games gold medalists for Japan
Olympic gold medalists for Japan
Olympic silver medalists for Japan
Medalists at the 1966 Asian Games
Medalists at the 1970 Asian Games
Universiade medalists in volleyball
Universiade gold medalists for Japan
20th-century Japanese people